In geometry, the Hart circle is derived from three given circles that cross pairwise to form eight circular triangles. For any one of these eight triangles, and its three neighboring triangles, there exists a Hart circle, tangent to the inscribed circles of these four circular triangles. Thus, the three given circles have eight Hart circles associated with them. The Hart circles are named after their discover, Andrew Searle Hart. They can be seen as analogous to the nine-point circle of straight-sided triangles.

References

External links 
 History of the Nine-Point Circle, Cambridge University
 Discussion of Hart Circle in context of Feuerbach's theorem
 On Centers and Central Lines of Triangles in the Elliptic Plane
 CRC Concise Encyclopedia of Mathematics by Eric W. Weisstein

Geometry
Triangles
Circles
Triangle geometry
Polygons